Kołodziąż-Rybie  is a village in the administrative district of Gmina Sadowne, within Węgrów County, Masovian Voivodeship, in east-central Poland.

References

Villages in Węgrów County